Chintal Gandhi (born 25 August 1994) is an Indian cricketer. He made his Twenty20 debut on 10 January 2021, for Baroda in the 2020–21 Syed Mushtaq Ali Trophy.

References

External links
 

1994 births
Living people
Indian cricketers
Baroda cricketers
Place of birth missing (living people)